Thomas Francis Liberatore (born 16 May 1992) is an Australian rules footballer who plays for the  in the Australian Football League (AFL). He is the eldest son of former Bulldogs player Tony Liberatore. He was born and raised in Melbourne, Victoria while attending St Kevin's College, and played top-level junior football with the Calder Cannons in the NAB League.

Liberatore was drafted with the 40th selection of the 2010 AFL draft. He made his AFL debut in the 2010 AFL season. Since then, Liberatore has been a AFL Premiership player, a Charles Sutton Medallist, a two-time Doug Hawkins Medallist, a two-time Gary Dempsey Medallist and a dual-member of the 22 Under 22 team. He has polled a total of 22 Brownlow Medal votes in his career.

Early life and career
Liberatore was born in Melbourne, Victoria. The son of Tony Liberatore, former  player, and Brownlow Medallist, and mother Jane, he was the eldest of three children. He has a younger brother, Oliver, and a younger sister, Meg. Liberatore represented Victoria at under-16 level in 2008. Although he put time into cricket, playing with his school and St.Bernard's Cricket Club. He was eventually drafted to the Bulldogs from the Calder Cannons in the TAC Cup with the 40th selection in the 2010 AFL Draft as a father-son selection, after Sydney nominated their intention to draft him with second-round pick if available. Fellow schoolmate and friend Mitch Wallis was also drafted ahead of Liberatore at pick 22, after the two had played together for St. Bernard's Junior Football Club, St Kevin's College and Calder Cannons since a young age. He graduated school with a 94 on his ATAR score.

He was selected in the junior All-Australian team after the 2010 NAB AFL Under-18 Championships, where he had averaged 22 disposals at 72 per cent efficiency, five clearances and four tackles. In the 2010 TAC Cup Grand Final, he had 28 disposals in the Cannons' 58-point defeat of Gippsland Power.

AFL career

2011—2014: Early career
Liberatore gathered 28 disposals in just his second senior game ever, also laying 10 tackles, a glimpse of the high pressure player he was going to become. Liberatore played 16 games in his debut season, averaging over 18 possessions per game and winning the Chris Grant Best First Year Player Award after an 'impressive' debut season.
Liberatore had a controversial 2012 season, being sanctioned by the club for drug offences after just 17 games for the season. On 5 August 2012, after a heavy loss to the Kangaroos in Round 19, Liberatore was found by police unconscious on King Street and was questioned about drug offences relating to the possession of what was believed to be ecstasy. He was subsequently suspended for the remainder of the season by the Bulldogs. In addition, he was issued a $5,000 suspended fine, required to undergo club-driven counselling and education, and be engaged in full-time employment for the following six weeks. Liberatore issued a public apology for his actions. Despite missing out on five games, Liberatore came 7th in the Charles Sutton Medal voting and polled 81 votes, 87 votes behind winner Matthew Boyd.

Liberatore improved in the following season, establishing himself as one of the AFL's most statistically dominant inside midfielders; he ranked first in the league for clearances and second in contested possessions, behind only 's Josh Kennedy. Liberatore had one of his career-best games against  in the final round of the 2013 AFL season, kicking one goal, collecting 26 disposals, and 11 tackles, just one tackle off his record at the time. He was named as best on ground for that game. He also had another best on ground performance against , collecting 33 disposals, a goal, 6 tackles and 4 marks. Liberatore signed a three-year contract extension with the Bulldogs in August, tying him to the club until 2016. He was recognized for his impressive efforts for the season with selection in the AFL Players' Association's inaugural 22 Under 22 team. He was named as a follower alongside Tom Nicholls and Jaeger O'Meara. He also claimed the Doug Hawkins Medal (best and fairest runner up), after polling 242 votes, just 31 votes behind winner Ryan Griffen. He won the Tony Liberatore Most Improved Player award at the Bulldogs' best-and-fairest count, and also polled 14 votes at the Brownlow Medal count.

Liberatore had an outstanding performance against  in round eight of the 2014 AFL season, kicking two goals, collecting 27 disposals and getting a career-high 14 tackles. He also had a great game against  in Round 13, leading the game in tackles (10), contested possessions (23), and disposals (34). Liberatore was recognised for having his most successful season yet, winning his first Charles Sutton Medal. He polled 235 votes, a 67 votes ahead of second placed Jack Macrae. He also won a plethora of other club awards, including the Scott West Most Courageous Player Award, the John Van Groningen Team First Award, and the Brad Johnson Best Team Player. He was also named in the initial 40 man squad of the 2014 All-Australian team. Coach Brendan McCartney praised his efforts at the end of the season, stating "He's tough, he uses the ball well, he defends and he cares deeply about this club and he's a fighter."

2015—2019: Injuries and premiership glory
In May 2015, he signed a contract extension that kept him tied to the Bulldogs until the end of the 2018 season.

Liberatore was a key driving force in the 2016 AFL season as the Bulldogs broke their 62-year premiership drought, playing 21 games over the course of the season. Liberatore kicked 14 goals over the course of the season, the most goals he kicked in a season. Liberatore tied the AFL record for most tackles in one game in the 's 32 point victory against  in the 8th round of the 2016 AFL season, collecting an astonishing 19 tackles over the course of the game due to the absence of running half-backs such as Bob Murphy and Jason Johannisen. His record has only been matched by Jack Ziebell and Jude Bolton. Coach Luke Beveridge lauded his efforts after the game, stating "We're not a huge tackling side because we are a high possession side, but that was almost a quarter of our tackles I think. It's quite extraordinary, in particular his third and fourth efforts." Liberatore also had a great game against  in the 12th round of the season, gaining 24 disposals, one goal, eight tackles and 13 clearances. To get him fit for the finals series, doctors used a rarely-used strategy involving the insertion of surgical string into his ankle in order to aid the recovery of his ankle at a quicker pace. He played every game in the 2016 finals series, during that time collecting a total of 79 disposals, 22 tackles, 23 clearances and 5 marks. Liberatore played in the 2016 AFL Grand Final despite an ankle injury suffered in the preliminary final the previous week, during his celebrations. Just before the beginning of the Grand Final, he realised he had forgotten his boots, and had to get his housemate to retrieve them for him. Liberatore just missed out on the Top 3 of the Charles Sutton Medal voting, placing 4th behind winner Marcus Bontempelli, runner up Dale Morris and third placed Lachie Hunter. He also won the Scott West Most Courageous Player Award.

Liberatore's form dropped off in what was to be a disappointing 2017 season for both him and the Western Bulldogs. Playing 18 games, Liberatore averaged much lower amounts of kicks, handballs, disposals, marks and goals then he had in all previous years, and critics described his season as disappointing. Before this slump in form however, Liberatore started off the season with four solid games, getting a total of 47 tackles, 77 disposals and 2 goals. However, after these first four games he entered a period of poor form, only reaching 20 or more disposals five more times for the rest of the season. Liberatore's pressure was one of the few things keeping him in the team, averaging 6.5 tackles per game, the second best season for tackles in his career. That wasn't enough for him to keep his spot in the team, and was dropped due to an incredibly poor eight disposal game against  in the 8th round of the 2017 AFL season, after which coach Luke Beveridge decided he needed some time in the VFL. Liberatore did not make the Top 10 of the Charles Sutton Medal voting for only the third time in his career, missing out in his debut season and in 2015.

The club confirmed that he would sit out the entire season the next day. During his rehabilitation, he took time to engage in other activities outside of football. Liberatore signed a one-year contract extension at the conclusion of the season.

2019 was another mediocre season for Liberatore, despite the Bulldogs making finals for the first time since 2016. Liberatore played 16 games, missing eight throughout the season. Despite initial fears that the injury was a second Anterior cruciate ligament injury, it was cleared as a more minor injury. He had one of his best games for the season in the 's 5 point loss against  in the third round after a solid start to the season, where he collected 30 disposals, 9 tackles and 12 clearances, named the Bulldogs' second best behind Marcus Bontempelli. He also had another great game against  the previous round, collecting 28 disposals, one goal and seven tackles. He was named as one of their best on ground. For the third year in a row, Liberatore did not reach the top 10 of the Charles Sutton Medal voting. He signed a two-year contract extension which kept him at the club until at least the end of 2021.

2020—present: Return to form
Liberatore began to improve upon his form after a chaotic year for the AFL due to the impact of the COVID-19 pandemic. He missed out on the first two rounds of the 2020 AFL season with knee soreness, the Bulldogs not taking any chances after Liberatore's history with knee injuries. In that game he kicked a goal after the siren at three quarter time and collected 18 disposals. A season best game in the ' six goal victory against  in the 17th round of the season came with a 28 disposal, nine tackle performance despite the 16 minute quarters as a result of rule changes brought about by the COVID-19 Pandemic. He was named as one of the team's best on ground. He also played a similarly impressive game in the final round of the home and away season which saw him named the Bulldogs' best on ground, gathering 25 disposals, 8 tackles and 7 clearances. Liberatore collected multiple awards at the conclusion of the season, including the Gary Dempsey Medal for third place in the Charles Sutton Medal voting, where he finished 45 votes behind winner Caleb Daniel and 30 votes behind captain Marcus Bontempelli. He also won the John Van Groningen Domestique Award, which honours the player who puts the team above all else on the field. Liberatore obtained the Brad Johnson Best Team Player Award for the second time in his career.

The 2021 AFL season saw Liberatore reach his best form since the 2014 season. Just three weeks into the season, it was revealed that Liberatore was second in the league for generating scores, behind  ruckman Nic Naitanui. His two goals late in the game helped seal the victory for the Bulldogs. Liberatore had 13 clearances and 27 disposals in the team's round eight comeback win against , helping propel the team to a win–loss record of 7-1.

Statistics
 Statistics are correct to the end of Round 23 2022

|- style="background-color: #EAEAEA"
! scope="row" style="text-align:center" | 2011
|style="text-align:center;"|
| 21 || 16 || 4 || 1 || 119 || 174 || 293 || 30 || 77 || 0.3 || 0.1 || 7.4 || 10.9 || 18.3 || 1.9 || 4.8
|-
! scope="row" style="text-align:center" | 2012
|style="text-align:center;"|
| 21 || 17 || 4 || 1 || 179 || 172 || 351 || 64 || 65 || 0.2 || 0.1 || 10.5 || 10.1 || 20.6 || 3.8 || 3.8
|- style="background-color: #EAEAEA"
! scope="row" style="text-align:center" | 2013
|style="text-align:center;"|
| 21 || 22 || 3 || 3 || 285 || 286 || 571 || 66 || 137 || 0.1 || 0.1 || 13.0 || 13.0 || 26.0 || 3.0 || 6.2
|-
! scope="row" style="text-align:center" | 2014
|style="text-align:center;"|
| 21 || 22 || 7 || 5 || 244 || 278 || 522 || 61 || bgcolor=CAE1FF | 173† || 0.3 || 0.2 || 11.1 || 12.6 || 23.7 || 2.8 || 7.9
|- style="background-color: #EAEAEA"
! scope="row" style="text-align:center" | 2015
|style="text-align:center;"|
| 21 || 0 || — || — || — || — || — || — || — || — || — || — || — || — || — || —
|-
| scope=row bgcolor=F0E68C | 2016# 
|style="text-align:center;"|
| 21 || 21 || 14 || 3 || 172 || 257 || 429 || 46 || 114 || 0.7 || 0.1 || 8.2 || 12.2 || 20.4 || 2.2 || 5.4
|- style="background-color: #EAEAEA"
! scope="row" style="text-align:center" | 2017
|style="text-align:center;"|
| 21 || 18 || 7 || 4 || 101 || 209 || 310 || 36 || 117 || 0.4 || 0.2 || 5.6 || 11.6 || 17.2 || 2.0 || 6.5
|-
! scope="row" style="text-align:center" | 2018
|style="text-align:center;"|
| 21 || 1 || — || — || 2 || 1 || 3 || — || — || — || — || 2.0 || 1.0 || 3.0 || — || —
|- style="background-color: #EAEAEA"
! scope="row" style="text-align:center" | 2019
|style="text-align:center;"|
| 21 || 15 || 6 || 8 || 139 || 175 || 314 || 41 || 59 || 0.4 || 0.5 || 9.3 || 11.7 || 20.9 || 2.7 || 3.9
|-
! scope="row" style="text-align:center" | 2020
|style="text-align:center;"|
| 21 || 16 || 5  || 3 || 150 || 182 || 332 || 31 || 57 || 0.3 || 0.2 || 9.3 || 11.4 || 20.8 || 2.0  || 3.6
|-  style="background-color: #EAEAEA"
! scope="row" style="text-align:center" | 2021
|style="text-align:center;"|
| 21 || 25 || 14 || 12 || 285 || 313 || 598 || 65 || 135 || 0.6 || 0.5 || 11.4 || 12.5 || 23.9 || 2.6 || 5.4
|-
! scope="row" style="text-align:center" | 2022
|style="text-align:center;"|
| 21 || 22 || 9 || 9 || 254 || 290 || 544 || 68 || 104 || 0.4 || 0.4 || 11.5 || 13.2 || 24.7 || 3.1 || 4.7
|- style="background-color: #EAEAEA"
|- class="sortbottom"
! colspan=3| Career
! 195
! 73
! 49
! 1930
! 2337
! 4267
! 508
! 1038
! 0.3
! 0.2
! 9.8
! 11.9
! 21.8
! 2.6
! 5.3
|}

Notes

Personal life
Liberatore has two children, born in 2015 and 2020. He is in a relationship with his partner, Malia. He has volunteered for a charity called Ladder, which aims to improve life for young people in Australia by working with AFL players to mentor young people. He also was going through the process of setting up an app called "Busket", which aims to help buskers in the city, in order to help reduce homelessness. Liberatore studied creative writing at RMIT University, and has publicly stated his admiration of the writing of Hunter S. Thompson in his studies.

Honours and achievements

AFL
Team
AFL premiership: 2016
Individual
Charles Sutton Medal (Western Bulldogs B&F): 2014
2x Scott West Most Courageous Award - Western Bulldogs : 2014, 2016
Doug Hawkins Medal - Western Bulldogs: 2013
Gary Dempsey Medal - Western Bulldogs: 2020
Western Bulldogs Tony Liberatore Most Improved Player Award: 2013
Chris Grant Medal - Western Bulldogs Best First Year Player: 2011
John Van Groningen Domestique Award - Western Bulldogs: 2020
2x Brad Johnson Best Team Player - Western Bulldogs: 2014, 2020
TAC Cup
Team
2× TAC Cup premiers - Calder Cannons : 2009, 2010

References

External links

1992 births
Living people
Australian rules footballers from Melbourne
Western Bulldogs players
Western Bulldogs Premiership players
People educated at St Kevin's College, Melbourne
Calder Cannons players
Charles Sutton Medal winners
Australian people of Italian descent
One-time VFL/AFL Premiership players